Socotra: The Hidden Land is a documentary film produced by Kilogram Box in 2015. The documentary examines how the society of the island of Socotra, Yemen, is emerging from its isolation and its daily struggle to preserve their traditions in the face of globalization.

The ancient beliefs and lifestyles of the Island of Socotra had remained unchanged for centuries, hidden from the eyes of the world. In their own words, the people use their traditional tales, beliefs and ways of life to explain how their island is, not always willingly, adapting its mode of existence to the modern world.

The documentary has won several international awards: 
 the Rising Star Award from the Canada International Film Festival
the Silver Palm Award from the Mexico International Film Festival
 Best Cinematography from the CEBU International Film Festival 

It also received a nomination for Best European Documentary from the ECU- The European Independent Film Festival.

Plot 

Socotra: The Hidden Land is the story of a lost land where its people's beliefs and lifestyles remained unchanged for centuries, separate from the rest of the world. To move through its coastal areas and unique landscapes is to cross a frontier in time, on an amazing journey that can be made only once, as the experience the next time will be quite different. The film.reveals the beauty and the striking strangeness of the island while showing the physical reality of Socotra and how it has shaped the islanders' lives over the centuries. 

The inhabitants have always lived virtually isolated from modern society, and have subsisted with very few resources, but they have great spiritual and cultural wealth. The documentary is a reflection of the life and customs of this isolated society, told by some of the most remarkable characters on the island, who use their own words, and their own traditional tales, beliefs and ways of life, to tell us about their spirit, their future and their daily struggle to preserve their traditions in the face of globalization.

Production company 
Kilogram Box is a film production company based in Barcelona, Spain. Since its inception, the company has demonstrated its commitment to innovative ideas, financial independence and artistic and ethical integrity.

Kilogram Box has collaborated on publicity for brands such as Ikea, Freixenet, President and Tampax, and on branding and identity design for the Basilica of the Sagrada Familia, Danone, Sanofi and the NGO Observatori DESC.

Through film, Kilogram Box seeks to show the rich cultural heritage of the planet, and with many unique communities at risk or on the brink of extinction. The studio collaborates with these endangered communities, giving them global visibility and the opportunity to explain their lives and the difficulties they face in their own words.

Awards

References 

 Out Of Hadhramout: Socotra: The Hidden Land.

External links 
 Official website
 IMDb
 Watch the documentary on Vimeo On Demand
 Official Trailer - YouTube
 Kilogram Box - Production Company

Spanish documentary films
Socotra
2015 films